The 1993 Iowa Hawkeyes football team represented the University of Iowa in the 1993 NCAA Division I-A football season as a member of the Big Ten Conference. The team was coached by Hayden Fry and played their home games at Kinnick Stadium.

Schedule

Roster

Game summaries

Tulsa

Sources: Box score and Game recap

at Iowa State

Sources: Box score and Game recap

Penn State

Sources: Box score and Game recap

at Michigan

at Indiana

Illinois

at Michigan State

Purdue

Sources: Box score

Northern Illinois

Sources: Box score and Game recap

at Northwestern

Sources: Box score and Game recap

Minnesota

Sources: Box score and Game recap

The win over Minnesota marked Hayden Fry's 200th career victory.

vs. California (Alamo Bowl)

Sources: Box score

Awards and honors

Team players in the 1994 NFL Draft

References

Iowa
Iowa Hawkeyes football seasons
Iowa Hawkeyes football